Zinc finger protein with KRAB and SCAN domains 1 is a protein that in humans is encoded by the ZKSCAN1 gene.

See also
 Chromosome 7 (human)
 Krüppel associated box (KRAB) domain
 Zinc finger protein

References

Further reading